The 2008–09 Iraq Division One.

Format and teams

Final qualification round

On December 4, 2009, the Iraq Football Federation met and decided that the final qualifying round will be played on one stage. Six clubs will play in Baghdad for the period from December 8 to 15, with five rounds, with three matches each day, with a break for the next day. Two of these teams will qualify for the 2009–10 Iraqi Premier League next season, joined by the six teams that already secured promotion in the previous round.

The matches are to be played on five stadiums: Al-Shorta Stadium, Al-Zawraa Stadium, Al-Quwa Al-Jawiya Stadium, Al Karkh Stadium and Al Naft Stadium.

Number of teams by Iraqi Governorates

Final qualification round
The final qualification round will be one group, each team plays five game with other teams. The top two teams from group were to qualify for the 2009–10 Iraqi Premier League next season, but eventually the top four all qualified due to the withdrawal of Sulaymaniya and Sirwan from the Iraqi Premier League.

Season statistics

Top scorers

Final qualification round

Others
 2008–09 Iraqi Premier League
 2011–12 Iraq Division One

References

External links
 Iraq Football Association

Iraq Division One seasons
Division One